Teneligliptin (INN; trade name Tenelia) is a pharmaceutical drug for the treatment of type 2 diabetes mellitus.  It belongs to the class of anti-diabetic drugs known as dipeptidyl peptidase-4 inhibitors or "gliptins".

Creation
It was created by Mitsubishi Tanabe Pharma and launched in September 2012 by both Mitsubishi Tanabe Pharma and Daiichi Sankyo in Japan.

Licensing and use

Japan/Korea/India/Argentina
It is approved for use in Japan, Argentina, Korea and India.

Pharmacology
Teneligliptin has unique J shaped or anchor locked domain structure because of which it has a potent inhibition of DPP 4 enzyme.

Teneligliptin significantly controls glycemic parameters with safety.  No dose adjustment is required in renally impaired patients.

References 

Dipeptidyl peptidase-4 inhibitors
Pyrazoles
Piperazines